The 2010 MLP Nations Cup was the eighth edition of the women's ice hockey tournament. It was held from January 5-9, 2010 in Ravensburg, Germany. The Canadian U22 national team won the tournament by defeating Switzerland in the final.

Tournament

First round

Group A

Group B

Final round

5th place game

Semifinals

3rd place game

Final

External links
Tournament on hockeyarchives.info

2010–11
2010–11 in women's ice hockey
2010–11 in Swiss ice hockey
2010–11 in German ice hockey
2010–11 in Canadian women's ice hockey
2010–11 in Finnish ice hockey
2010–11 in Russian ice hockey
2010–11 in Swedish ice hockey
2010